The following is a list of Malayalam films released in the year 2001.

Dubbed films

 2001
2001
Lists of 2001 films by country or language
 Mal
2001 in Indian cinema